Michelle McAdorey is a Canadian singer-songwriter based in Toronto, Ontario. She was a member of the 1990s band Crash Vegas, and also performed and recorded as a solo artist.

Early life
McAdorey was born in Toronto. She is the niece of Canadian television personality Bob McAdorey.

Career
In the early 1980s, McAdorey lived in the United Kingdom, where she was briefly a backup singer for Kirsty MacColl. While there, she joined a new wave band called Corect Spelling . Although the band received widespread exposure for their debut single, "Love Me Today", produced by Midge Ure, the band broke up after receiving poor support from their label.

McAdorey eventually moved back to Toronto, where she wrote songs with Blue Rodeo's Greg Keelor, and appeared in the video for Blue Rodeo's hit single "Try".

McAdorey and Keelor later formed the band Crash Vegas; they recruited Jocelyne Lanois and drummer Ambrose Pottie to complete the group. The songs she had written with Keelor were included in that band's 1990 debut album, Red Earth. Crash Vegas went on to release two more albums, Stone in 1993, for which McAdorey was the main songwriter, and Aurora in 1995.

Crash Vegas disbanded in 1996. In 2000, McAdorey released her solo debut, Whirl. The same year, she appeared on King Cobb Steelie's fourth album, Mayday, co-writing and lending her vocals to the title track. In 2003 McAdorey released Love Don't Change with Eric Chenaux. The two had played together for years and this recording was a document of their live playing to date. In 2013 McAdorey released a single on Peterborough label Seventh Fire as part of a limited edition 7" vinyl club.

Her latest solo album, Into Her Future, was released on 30 October 2015 via DWR, and was a longlisted nominee for the 2016 Polaris Music Prize. The album appeared on the !earshot National Top 50 Chart in December that year.

References

External links
Michelle McAdorey

Canadian women rock singers
Canadian singer-songwriters
Living people
Musicians from Toronto
Year of birth missing (living people)
Canadian folk rock musicians
Canadian women pop singers
Crash Vegas members
20th-century Canadian women singers
21st-century Canadian women singers